J. Adam Larose, who uses the professional name J. LaRose, is a Navajo actor.

He has worked with Darren Lynn Bousman, who directed the films in the Saw series, on six projects; Identity Lost, Butterfly Dreams, Saw III, Repo! The Genetic Opera, the Fear Itself episode "New Year's Day", and Devil's Carnival. Two of which were Darren Lynn Bousman's first short films, Repo! The Genetic Opera was a short directed by Darren Lynn Bousman to promote a feature film to Lionsgate. It successfully did and after Saw IV, Darren Lynn Bousman directed a full-length feature film version of Repo! The Genetic Opera, in which J. Larose played the Vanity and Vein reporter who interviews Rotti Largo about Zydrate addiction. J. Larose played the lead in each; Butterfly Dreams and Identity Lost. However, he made his Hollywood film debut in a much smaller role as Troy, a helpless victim of Jigsaw in Saw III. A new commentary track with Darren Lynn Bousman and J. Larose was included on the Director's Cut DVD of Saw III. LaRose plays The Major in The Devil's Carnival, a 2012 film from Darren Lynn Bousman and Terrance Zdunich.

Filmography
 Butterfly Dreams (2000) as James Luther
 Saw III (2006) as Troy
 Repo! The Genetic Opera (2006 short film) as Pavi Largo
 Saw IV (2007) as Troy (flashback)
 Repo! The Genetic Opera (2008) as Vanity and Vein reporter
 The Tenant (2009) as Jeff
 For the Love of Jade (2009) as Clemens
 Mother's Day as Hospital Security Guard
 11-11-11 (2011) as Wayne
 Insidious (2011) as Long Haired Fiend
 Pennhurst (2011) as Willard
 The Devil's Carnival (2012) as The Major
 Insidious: Chapter 2 (2013) as Long Haired Fiend
 Missionary (2013) as Sarge Powell
Now You See Me (2014) as FBI Agent
 Last Shift (2014) as Homeless Man
 To Write Love on Her Arms (2015) as Echo
Extremity (2018) as Phil
 Big Top Evil (2019) as Roadside Jack
America: The Motion Picture as Native American Right Activist (voice)

TV
 Mind of Mencia as Indian
 In Search Of...Mitch Pileggi as Ancient Man
 Sheena - "The Feral King" as Raoul
 Fear Itself - "New Year's Day" as Parking Garage Thug
 Fear the Walking Dead - "This Land is Your Land" as Old Nation Man
 Mayans M.C. - "Buho/Muwan" as Adam

References

External links
 

American male film actors
Living people
Place of birth missing (living people)
Navajo people
Native American male actors
1972 births
20th-century Native Americans
21st-century Native Americans